Pukyu Rumi (Quechua pukyu spring, well, rumi stone, "spring stone", also spelled Puquiorumi) is a mountain in the Cordillera Central in the Andes of Peru which reaches a height of approximately . It is located in the Lima Region, Yauyos Province, on the border of the districts of Huancaya and Tanta.

References 

Mountains of Peru
Mountains of Lima Region